Panthalassa: The Remixes is a remix album by Miles Davis, released on May 25, 1999. It contains compositions from the prior albums, including In a Silent Way, Get Up With It and On the Corner.

Track listing 

* Only featured on the vinyl LP release of the album.

Personnel
Miles Davis — Trumpet
Mark Boyce — Fender Rhodes, Polymoog
Phillip Charles — ARP 2600, Roland Jupiter-6, Remixing
DJ Cam — Mixing, Remixing
Sean Evans — Design
King Britt — Additional Production, Drum Programming, Fender Rhodes, Remixing
Bill Laswell — Mixing Translation, Reconstruction
Robert Musso — Engineer
Jamie Myerson — Producer, Remixing
Doc Scott — Engineer, Producer, Remix Producer, Remixing
Jon Smeltz — Engineer, Mixing

References

External links 

Miles Davis remix albums
1999 remix albums
Columbia Records remix albums